Pseudoneoponera rufipes is a species of ant of the subfamily Ponerinae. It is found in southern and eastern Asia.

Subspecies
Pseudoneoponera rufipes ceylonensis (Jerdon, 1851) - Sri Lanka
Pseudoneoponera rufipes rufipes Forel, 1911 - India, Nepal, Thailand, Vietnam, China

References

External links

 at antwiki.org
Animaldiversity.org

Ponerinae
Hymenoptera of Asia
Insects described in 1851